Ironwolf is a fictional character which appeared in the last three issues of Weird Worlds, a comics anthology series published by American company DC Comics from 1972 to 1974.

Ironwolf was  created by Howard Chaykin, who plotted and drew the stories. Denny O'Neil scripted and Walt Simonson was the letterer. Ironwolf has no super powers, but he is an extraordinary hand-to-hand combat fighter. He is a master swordsman and highly skilled with the guns of his era. He sometimes uses antique 20th Century weapons like a .357 Magnum.

Ironwolf was heavily influenced by the works of Edgar Rice Burroughs, Robin Hood, and the 1948 film The Three Musketeers.

Fictional character history
Lord Ironwolf was the finest officer from Earth-based interstellar Empire Galaktika in the 61st century. On his homeworld of Illium, he owned millions of trees with "anti-gravity wood" from which starships, such as his own, were constructed. He renounced his privileged position, he was a former Imperial Officer of the Court, in opposition to Empress Erika Klein-Hernandez's policies and cruelties.

Hernandez asked Ironwolf to allow her new alien allies to make use of the trees. Fearing the aliens would then build their own fleet of starships, with which to attack the empire, Ironwolf flatly refused and smacked her across the face. As a result of his act of treason, he became a hunted outlaw and proceeded to wage a one-ship campaign of intergalactic rebellion against the Empress and her cohorts.

Later versions
The Weird Worlds stories were reprinted in an Ironwolf one-shot in March 1987.
Chaykin returned to the Ironwolf character in 1992, co-writing Ironwolf: Fires of the Revolution with frequent collaborator John Francis Moore. This graphic novel was penciled by Mike Mignola and inked by P. Craig Russell. Some of the events of the Weird World stories are recapitulated here but it also brings the story to something of a close.

References
 

Characters created by Howard Chaykin
Comics characters introduced in 1972
DC Comics male characters
DC Comics titles